Protein SSX4 is a protein that in humans is encoded by the SSX4 gene.

The product of this gene belongs to the family of highly homologous synovial sarcoma, X (SSX) breakpoint proteins. These proteins may function as transcriptional repressors. They are also capable of eliciting spontaneously humoral and cellular immune responses in cancer patients, and are potentially useful targets in cancer vaccine-based immunotherapy. SSX1, SSX2 and SSX4 genes have been involved in the t(X;18) chromosomal translocation characteristically found in all synovial sarcomas. This translocation results in the fusion of the synovial sarcoma translocation gene on chromosome 18 to one of the SSX genes on chromosome X. Chromosome Xp11 contains a segmental duplication resulting in two identical copies of synovial sarcoma, X breakpoint 4, SSX4 and SSX4B, in tail-to-tail orientation. This gene, SSX4, represents the more telomeric copy. Two transcript variants encoding distinct isoforms have been identified for this gene.

References

Further reading